The St. John's Lutheran College Girls Dormitory, also known as Mundinger Hall, is a historic building on the campus of the former St. John's College at 6th Ave and Gary Street in Winfield, Kansas.  The main section of the Late Gothic Revival building was constructed in 1949–50. The building was added to the National Register of Historic Places in 2002.

It was designed by architects Overend & Boucher.

See also 

 Baden Hall

 Rehwinkel Hall

References

Buildings and structures in Cowley County, Kansas
Gothic Revival church buildings in Kansas
Residential buildings completed in 1950
University and college buildings on the National Register of Historic Places in Kansas
Residential buildings on the National Register of Historic Places in Kansas
University and college dormitories in the United States
National Register of Historic Places in Cowley County, Kansas
1950 establishments in Kansas